Gashey is a rural locality (a selo) in Mukhorshibirsky District, Republic of Buryatia, Russia. The population was 534 as of 2010. There are 8 streets.

Geography 
Gashey is located 36 km west of Mukhorshibir (the district's administrative centre) by road. Zandin is the nearest rural locality.

References 

Rural localities in Mukhorshibirsky District